Brasstown Bald is the highest point in the U.S. state of Georgia. It is located in the northeastern part of the state in the Blue Ridge Mountains on the border between Towns and Union counties south of the city of Hiawassee. The mountain is known to the native Cherokee people as Enotah.

Description
The name in English is derived from a mistaken translation of the term for the nearby Cherokee village of Brasstown, located along the upper Brasstown Creek (named in English from the same error) feeding the Hiawassee River.

Immediately north of the mountain and across the state line with North Carolina are other places named by English settlers: Brasstown, a community in the Brasstown township of Clay County, North Carolina.

Brasstown Bald encompasses Towns and Union counties with the county line intersecting the peak. The mountain is part of the Blue Ridge Mountains (part of the Appalachian Mountains) and within the borders of the Blue Ridge Ranger District of the Chattahoochee National Forest. The mountain consists mostly of soapstone and dunite.

On a clear day it is possible to see the tallest buildings of Atlanta, some 85 miles away from the summit. The U.S. Forest Service has webcams atop the observation tower and a RAWS weather station further down the mountain. The public can drive to a parking lot  from the top via Georgia State Route 180 Spur and then continue to the summit via a shuttle bus or a short hike on a paved trail.

History

According to the two Georgia historical markers, the area surrounding Brasstown Bald was settled by the Cherokee people. English-speaking settlers derived the word "Brasstown" from a translation error of the Cherokee word for its village place. Settlers confused the word Itse'yĭ (meaning "New Green Place" or "Place of Fresh Green"), which the Cherokee used for their village, with Ûňtsaiyĭ ("brass"), and referred to the settlement as Brasstown. The Cherokee gave the locative name, Itse'yĭ, to several distinct areas in their territory, including an area nearby in what is considered present-day North Carolina.

According to Cherokee legend about Itse'yĭ, a great flood swept over the land. All the people died except a few Cherokee families who sought refuge in a giant canoe. The canoe ran aground at the summit of a forested mountain (now known as Enotah). As there was no wild game for the people to hunt and no place for them to plant crops, the Great Spirit killed all the trees on the top of the mountain so that the surviving people could plant crops. They continued planting and lived from their crops until the water subsided.

Other transliterated spellings of the Cherokee name for the mountain include Echia, Echoee, Etchowee, and  Enotah.

The term "Bald" is common terminology in the southern Appalachians describing mountaintops that have 360-degree unobstructed views.

Former Georgia Supreme Court Judge Thomas S. Candler is memorialized with a stone monument at Brasstown Bald. It was erected in 1971 three months before he died in recognition of his efforts to support getting more visitors to the mountain and establishing a visitor center there for them.

Distances to summit

An additional route to the summit is the Wagon Train Trail, starting at Young Harris College. The trail is traditionally hiked by graduating students and their families on the evening before graduation; a vespers service is held at the summit.

Tour de Georgia
In the 2005 through 2008 editions of the Tour de Georgia, a long-distance bicycle race, Brasstown Bald was the site of an hors categorie "King of the Mountains stage" finish.

Broadcasting
NOAA Weather Radio station KXI22 transmits from atop the mountain, simulcasting with KXI75 from Blue Ridge, Georgia. The programming originates from NWSFO Peachtree City.

Georgia Public Broadcasting had or has construction permits from the Federal Communications Commission (FCC) for two low-power broadcast translator stations at the summit. The digital TV station on channel 12 (W25FP-D, licensed December 2009) is the direct replacement for analog TV station W04BJ in nearby Young Harris, and also covers for W50AB in nearby Hiawassee (both to the north).  New station WBTB FM 90.3 will transmit at just 97 watts, equivalent to several hundred watts because of the height above average terrain of over 700 meters, or more than 2,300 feet.  Both stations will have Young Harris as the city of license.

Images

See also

 Brasstown Valley Resort
 Brasstown Wilderness
 List of U.S. states by elevation

References

 Georgia's Named Summits
 100 highest peaks in Georgia
 Georgia peaks over 4,000 feet
 NWR coverage map for KXI22

External links

Mountains of Georgia (U.S. state)
Protected areas of Towns County, Georgia
Protected areas of Union County, Georgia
Highest points of U.S. states
Chattahoochee-Oconee National Forest
Appalachian balds
Mountains of Towns County, Georgia
Mountains of Union County, Georgia
North American 1000 m summits